A space sunshade or sunshield is a parasol that diverts or otherwise reduces some of the Sun's radiation, preventing it from hitting a spacecraft or planet and thereby reducing its insolation, which results in reduced heating.  Light can be diverted by different methods. The concept of the construction of sunshade as a method of climate engineering dates back to the years 1923,1929, 1957 und 1978 by the physicist Hermann Oberth. Space mirrors in orbit around the earth with a diameter of 100 to 300 km, as designed by Hermann Oberth, are intended to focus sunlight on indiviual regions oft he earth’s surface or deflect it into space so that the solar radiation is weakened in a specifically controlled manner for individual regions on the earth’s surface. 
First proposed in 1989, another space sunshade concept involves putting a large occulting disc, or technology of equivalent purpose, between the Earth and Sun.  

A sunshade is of particular interest as a climate engineering method for mitigating global warming through solar radiation management.  Heightened interest in such projects reflects the concern that internationally negotiated reductions in carbon emissions may be insufficient to stem climate change.  Sunshades could also be used to produce space solar power, acting as solar power satellites. Proposed shade designs include a single-piece shade and a shade made by a great number of small objects. Most such proposals contemplate a blocking element at the Sun-Earth L1 Lagrangian point.

In 1989, James Early proposed a space-based sun-shade to divert sunlight at the planetary level.  His design involved making a large glass (2,000 km) occulter from lunar material and placing at the L1 point.  Issues included the large amount of material needed to make the disc and also the energy to launch it to its orbit.

Designs for planetary sunshade

Cloud of small spacecraft 
One proposed sunshade would be composed of 16 trillion small disks at the Sun-Earth L1 Lagrangian point, 1.5 million kilometers above Earth. Each disk is proposed to have a 0.6-meter diameter and a thickness of about 5 micrometers. The mass of each disk would be about a gram, adding up to a total of almost 20 million tonnes. Such a group of small sunshades that blocks 2% of the sunlight, deflecting it off into space, would be enough to halt global warming, giving ample time to cut emissions back on Earth.

The individual autonomous flyers building up the cloud of sunshades are proposed not to reflect the sunlight but rather to be transparent lenses, deflecting the light slightly so it does not hit Earth.  This minimizes the effect of solar radiation pressure on the units, requiring less effort to hold them in place at the L1 point.  An optical prototype has been constructed by Roger Angel with funding from NIAC.

The remaining solar pressure and the fact that the L1 point is one of unstable equilibrium, easily disturbed by the wobble of the Earth due to gravitational effects from the Moon, requires the small autonomous flyers to be capable of maneuvering themselves to hold position.  A suggested solution is to place mirrors capable of rotation on the surface of the flyers.  By using the solar radiation pressure on the mirrors as solar sails and tilting them in the right direction, the flyer will be capable of altering its speed and direction to keep in position.

Such a group of sunshades would need to occupy an area of about 3.8 million square kilometers if placed at the L1 point. The deployment of the flyers is an issue that requires reusable rockets. With a 100t LEO rocket, a single launch per day would allow the release of the required number of sails within 20 years, at a goal of 1% reduction. 
 
Even so, it would still take years to launch enough of the disks into orbit to have any effect.  This means a long lead time.  Roger Angel of the University of Arizona  presented the idea for a sunshade at the U.S. National Academy of Sciences in April 2006 and won a NASA Institute for Advanced Concepts grant for further research in July 2006. Creating this sunshade in space was estimated to cost in excess of US$130 billion over 20 years with an estimated lifetime of 50-100 years. Thus leading Professor Angel to conclude that "the sunshade is no substitute for developing renewable energy, the only permanent solution. A similar massive level of technological innovation and financial investment could ensure that. But if the planet gets into an abrupt climate crisis that can only be fixed by cooling, it would be good to be ready with some shading solutions that have been worked out."

A more recent design has been proposed by Olivia Borgue and Andreas Hein in 2022 proposing a distributed sunshade with a mass on the order of 100,000 tons.

One Fresnel lens

Several authors have proposed dispersing light before it reaches the Earth by putting a very large lens in space, perhaps at the L1 point between the Earth and the Sun. This plan was proposed in 1989 by J. T. Early.

In 2004, physicist and science fiction author Gregory Benford calculated that a concave rotating Fresnel lens 1000 kilometres across, yet only a few millimeters thick, floating in space at the  point, would reduce the solar energy reaching the Earth by approximately 0.5% to 1%.

The cost of such a lens has been disputed. At a science fiction convention in 2004, Benford estimated that it would cost about US$10 billion up front, and another $10 billion in supportive cost during its lifespan.

One diffraction grating
A similar approach involves placing a very large diffraction grating (thin wire mesh) in space, perhaps at the L1 point between the Earth and the Sun. A proposal for a 3,000 ton diffraction mesh was made in 1997 by Edward Teller, Lowell Wood, and Roderick Hyde, although in 2002 these same authors argued for blocking solar radiation in the stratosphere rather than in orbit given then-current space launch technologies.

Spacecraft sunshades
The James Webb Space Telescope (JWST) infrared telescope has a layered sunshade to keep the telescope cold.

For spacecraft approaching the Sun, the sunshade is usually called a heatshield. Notable spacecraft [designs] with heatshields include:
 Messenger, launched 2004, orbited Mercury until 2015, had a ceramic cloth sunshade
 Parker Solar Probe (was Solar Probe Plus), launched 2018 (carbon, carbon-foam, carbon sandwich heatshield)
 Solar Orbiter, launched Feb 2020
 BepiColombo, to orbit Mercury, with Optical Solar Reflectors (acting as a sunshade) on the Planetary Orbiter component.

See also

References

External links
 

Climate change mitigation
Terraforming
Climate engineering